Berry Bastion is a large, mostly ice-covered mountain in Antarctica with abrupt north facing rock cliffs. It was named by the Advisory Committee on Antarctic Names after M. John Berry, Assistant Secretary for Policy, Management and Budget, United States Department of the Interior, 1997–2000.

References
 

Mountains of Oates Land
Britannia Range (Antarctica)